"Jedna si jedina" ("You Are the One and Only") was the national anthem of Bosnia and Herzegovina between 1992 and 1998.

History
The music was taken from the old Bosnian folk song "S one strane Plive" ("On the far bank of the Pliva river" or "On the other side of the Pliva river"), which was reportedly inspired by the Turkish song "Sivastopol Marşı". The lyrics were written by Bosnian singer Dino Merlin; that version is featured on his 1993 album, Moja Bogda Sna. It was adopted in November 1992, several months after independence in March 1992. Political leaders of dominant Bosnian Serb and Bosnian Croat nationalist parties objected to it, and thus a new composition, the "Intermezzo", was approved and adopted by the United Nations as the country's national anthem in 1999.

Legacy
"Jedna si jedina" is still considered to be the de facto national anthem of Bosnia and Herzegovina by many Bosniaks; many Bosniaks still sing this song during performances of the Bosnian national anthem, as they believe that it should still be current as the present national anthem of Bosnia and Herzegovina does not have any official lyrics.

Lyrics
On most occasions, only the first verse followed by the chorus were performed.

Official lyrics

Alternate lyrics

See also
List of Bosnia and Herzegovina patriotic songs

References

Bosnia and Herzegovina music
Historical national anthems
National symbols of Bosnia and Herzegovina
Songs written by Dino Merlin
European anthems